Bhairavi: Aavigalukku Priyamanaval is a 2012-2017 Indian Tamil-language supernatural mystery television series that aired on Sun TV from 29 January 2012 to 10 September 2017 for 1317 episodes.

The series follows the life of Nithya Das/Mahalakshmi (Bhairavi), who has the ability to see and communicate with ghosts. The show is produced by Saregama and director by P.S Dharan and S. Selvakumar. The show completed its 1000th episode on 9th April 2016.

Plot
The plot of this series revolves around a young woman Bhairavi (Nitya Das/Sujitha/Radha), an antique shop owner who can see ghosts since childhood. She uses her special abilities as a psychic medium to help the ghosts cross over to the Light (afterlife). Suddenly her life turns into some mysterious events where she is identified as goddess Madhura kaali, Kannagi reincarnation and is expected by demon to take revenge for destroyed him in the past. But however, she destroyed him again in the present and moves on her life again. Meanwhile, Madhura, a soft and a devotee of Madhura kaali and selliyamman started her journey to find goddess selliyamman's original statue. There, she faces a lot of struggle simultaneously, bhairavi is doing her work normally. At last, Bhairavi married Vijay, influential Zamindhar's heir but a sudden twist was happened in the story by Introducing character thamini, an evil soul who is Zamindhar's lover in the past and waits for marrying Zamindhar in the present who is actually in the same appearance of vijay at present. Amidst a lot of struggles bhairavi saved her husband.

Cast

Main cast

Recurring cast

Guest stars

Original soundtrack

Title song
It was written by [[Dr. Kiruthiya
]]
. It was sung by Karthik, Priyadarshini and Anita.

Soundtrack

See also
 List of programs broadcast by Sun TV

References

External links
 Official Website

Sun TV original programming
Tamil-language horror fiction television series
2010s Tamil-language television series
2012 Tamil-language television series debuts
Tamil-language television shows
2017 Tamil-language television series endings